Yasir Qadhi (born January 30, 1975), is an American preacher, theologian, and Sunni imam. Since 2001, he has served as Dean of Academic Affairs at the Al-Maghrib Institute, an international Islamic educational institution with a center in Houston, Texas. He also taught in the Religious Studies department at Rhodes College in Memphis, Tennessee. He is currently the resident scholar of the East Plano Islamic Center in Plano, Texas.

Qadhi has written books and lectured widely on Islam and contemporary Muslim issues. A 2011 The New York Times Magazine essay by Andea Elliott described Qadhi as "one of the most influential conservative clerics in American Islam." Writing in 2017, journalist Graeme Wood called him "one of the two most prominent Muslim scholars in the United States today." He has also consistently been listed in The 500 Most Influential Muslims, most recently in 2022.  He has nevertheless been criticised for his views on women and for defending high-profile Al-Qaeda supporters, and the Taliban.

Qadhi was previously affiliated with the Salafi movement but has since left the movement and now only identifies himself as a Sunni.

Early years

Qadhi was born in Houston, Texas to Pakistani parents. His father, a doctor by profession, founded the first mosque in the area, while his mother is a microbiologist, both from Karachi in Pakistan. When he was five, the family moved to Jeddah, Saudi Arabia, where he attended local schools. By 15 he had memorized the Qur'an and graduated from high school two years early as class valedictorian. He returned to the United States, where he earned a B.Sc in Chemical Engineering at the University of Houston.

Professional career
After a short stint working in engineering at Dow Chemical, in 1996 Qadhi enrolled at the Islamic University of Medinah in Medina, Saudi Arabia. There, he earned a bachelor's degree in Arabic from the university's College of Hadith and Islamic Sciences and a master's degree in Islamic Theology from its College of Dawah. Qadhi returned to the United States after working and studying for nine years in Saudi Arabia. He completed a doctorate in theology at Yale University in New Haven, Connecticut.

Qadhi taught in the Religious Studies Department of Rhodes College, in Memphis, Tennessee. He previously was the Dean of Academic Affairs and an instructor for the AlMaghrib Institute. This is a seminar-based Islamic education institution founded in 2001. The instructors travel to teach Islamic studies in English. He moved to the Dallas metropolitan area in early 2019, becoming the resident scholar of the East Plano Islamic Center. He is currently the Dean of Academic Affairs at The Islamic Seminary of America. 

Qadhi notes that some of the practices he endorses are similar to those practiced by conservative Christian groups and Orthodox Jews in the United States. For instance, he says that each group observes dietary laws (which sometimes cover acceptable drinks), stresses family values, and requires modest dress for women.

Qadhi was a guest subject on an episode of Harvard professor Henry Louis Gates's television genealogy series Finding Your Roots on PBS.

Views 
Qadhi has been criticised for his views on women and for defending high-profile Al-Qaeda supporters and the Taliban.

Jihad

Qadhi has presented papers on jihad movements. In 2006, at a conference at Harvard Law School, Qadhi presented a 15-minute analysis of the theological underpinnings of an early militant movement in modern Saudi Arabia headed by Juhayman al-Otaibi. The movement had gained international attention when it held the Grand Mosque of Mecca hostage in 1979.

In September 2009, he presented a paper at an international conference at the University of Edinburgh on understanding jihad in the modern world. He discussed how the specific legal ruling (fatwā) of the 13–14th century theologian Ibn Taymiyya on the Mongol Empire has been wrongfully used in the 20th and 21st centuries by both jihadist and pacifist groups to justify their positions. The paper has been critiqued by some Salafi commentators, who argue that they in fact didn't revise the definition of Jihad.

Sufism and veneration of the saints

Qadhi believes that the practice of some Sufi Muslims visiting the graves of Sufi saints and calling upon Muhammad and calling upon them for help or guidance is not shirk (polytheism) but said it is haram, sinful, an evil innovation, and called it a stepping stone and gateway to shirk but not shirk in and of itself. Qadhi has also stated that these Muslims should still be regarded as Muslims, though misguided. He believes that questioning whether veneration of Sufi saints at gravesites can be called shirk is highly problematic because that would mean accusing many Muslim scholars who hold affirmative views towards it of committing shirk and being out of the fold of Islam. He has said it is not shirk in and of itself unless they believe they are calling out to a god, intend to worship or believe in the saints to have independent powers in and of themselves. He also believed that Sufi Muslims that participate in the practice do not believe in the saints to be gods and don't intend it to be worship when calling upon them nor believe they have independent powers.

Views on social issues 
Yasir Qadhi has criticized progressive Muslims like Moiz Khan that interpret Islamic law as supporting homosexual relations, saying these teachings contain "very little Islam".

In regards to religious liberties, Qadhi believes that Islamic teachings don't support or require that Muslim business owners discriminate or refuse service to LGBTQ individuals. Nonetheless, Qadhi expresses concern that Islamic institutions may face issues if they speak in a vulgar manner and employ or fire employees that don't conform to conservative beliefs regarding sexual behaviors.

Death threat by Islamic State of Iraq and the Syria
In the April 2016 issue of Dabiq Magazine, the Islamic State of Iraq and the Levant declared Qadhi, along with Hamza Yusuf, Bilal Philips, Suhaib Webb and numerous other Western Islamic speakers, as murtads (or apostates). It threatened to kill them for denouncing ISIS and the shooting attacks in Paris on the Charlie Hebdo offices.

Controversies
In January 2010, the British The Daily Telegraph reported that in 2001 Qadhi had described the Holocaust as a hoax and false propaganda, and had claimed that "Hitler never intended to mass-destroy the Jews." The following year, The New York Times recounted his claim that most Islamic studies professors in the United States are Jews who “want to destroy us.”

Qadhi denied stating that the Holocaust was a hoax or that it was false propaganda, but in 2008 admitted that he had briefly held mistaken beliefs about the Holocaust, and had said "that Hitler never actually intended to massacre the Jews, he actually wanted to expel them to neighboring lands". Qadhi acknowledged that his views were wrong and said "I admit it was an error". Qadhi added that he firmly believes "that the Holocaust was one of the worst crimes against humanity that the 20th century has witnessed" and that "the systematic dehumanization of the Jews in the public eye of the Germans was a necessary precursor" for that tragedy. More generally, he has admitted that he "fell down a slippery slope", expressing anger at actions of the Israeli government in the form of anti-Semitic remarks he later recognized as wrong.

In July 2010, Qadhi was selected to participate in an official delegation of eight U.S. imams and Jewish religious leaders to visit the concentration camps at Auschwitz and Dachau. The imams subsequently released a joint statement condemning anti-Semitism and labeling Holocaust denial as against the ethics of Islam.

The Times newspaper reported that British Charity Commission regulators contacted three Islamic charities about Qadhi's 2015 tour, where he allegedly made controversial comments and told students that "killing homosexuals and stoning adulterers was part of their religion." He also clarified to them that these punishments were only applicable in an Islamic society and were not to be applied in the West.

Works of Yasir Qadhi

Research papers 
Reconciling Reason and Revelation in the Writings of Ibn Taymiyyah (d. 728/1328): An Analytical Study of Ibn Taymiyyah’s Dar' at-ta’aarod, PhD Dissertation, 2013, Yale University. 
"The Unleashed Thunderbolts' Of Ibn Qayyim Al-Ǧawziyyah: An Introductory Essay", Oriente Moderno vol. 90, no. 1, 2010, pp. 135–149.
"A Christian Islamist?", Political Theology, vol. 14, issue 6, 2013, pp. 803–812.
 "Salafı-Ash'arı Polemics of the 3rd & 4th Islamic Centuries," The Muslim World, 2016.

Translations 

 Sunan Abu Dawud - first 2 volumes

See also
Dawah
Islam in the United States
List of Da'ees
Islam in Dallas

References 

1975 births
Living people
Muhajir people
University of Houston alumni
Islamic University of Madinah alumni
Yale University alumni
American Sunni Muslim scholars of Islam
American academics of Pakistani descent
21st-century Muslim theologians
Dow Chemical Company employees
American expatriates in Saudi Arabia